All Over the World may refer to:

 All Over the World: The Very Best of Electric Light Orchestra, a compilation album, 2005
 All Over the World (The Seekers album), 1978
 All Over the World (JJ Weeks Band album), 2013
 All Over the World, album by The Wailing Souls, 1992
 All Over the World, a compilation album by Arlo Guthrie, 1991
 "All Over the World" (Electric Light Orchestra song), 1980
 "All Over the World" (Ola song), 2010
 "All Over the World" (Françoise Hardy song), 1965
 "All Over the World", a song by Pet Shop Boys from their album Yes
 "All Over the World", a song by Pixies from their album Bossanova
 "All Over the World", a song by Chuck Jackson
 "There's a Kind of Hush (All Over the World)", a song by Geoff Stephens and Les Reed, recorded by Herman's Hermits in 1967 and by The Carpenters in 1976

See also
 All Around the World (disambiguation)